Kim Suk-won is the name of:

 Kim Suk-won (general) (1893–1978), World War II military officer
 Kim Suk-won (scouting) (born 1945), scouting leader
 Kim Seok-won (footballer) (born 1961), South Korean footballer